Iman (and its various different spellings) is a surname.

 Ahmed Mohamed Iman, Somalian politician
 Akhtar ul Iman (1915–1996), Urdu poet and screenwriter
 Akhtarul Iman, Indian politician
 Chanel Iman (born 1990), American model
 D. Imman (born 1983), Indian film composer and singer
 Dedi Iman (born 1985), Indonesian footballer
 Harun Iman (born 1981), Somali-American runner
 Ken Iman (1939–2010), American football player
 Ronald L. Iman, American statistician
 Santiago Imán, Creole revolutionary
 Sohibul Iman (born 1965), Indonesian politician
 Tamisha Iman (born 1970), American drag performer

See also 
 Iman
 Iman (given name)
 Inman (surname)